Juan Carlos Muñiz Armenteros    (born January 28, 1976) is a Cuban baseball outfielder. 

Muñiz is originally from Cuba and started his professional baseball career in the Cuban National Series. After the 2001 season, he traveled legally to Brazil but overstayed his visa while hoping to defect to the United States. He was signed by the Florida Marlins after a tryout in 2003 but the club had to wait another two years for him to get an American visa. During that time, he played played and coached baseball in Brazil.

Muñiz played in the Florida Marlins minor league system in 2005 and 2006 and played for the Chiba Lotte Marines of Nippon Professional Baseball in 2009 and 2010. He represented Brazil at the 2013 World Baseball Classic.

References

External links

1976 births
2013 World Baseball Classic players
Brazilian expatriate baseball players in Japan
Brazilian expatriate baseball players in the United States
Carolina Mudcats players
Chiba Lotte Marines players
Cuban expatriate baseball players in Japan
Jupiter Hammerheads players
Living people
Nippon Professional Baseball outfielders
Baseball players from Havana
Cuban expatriate baseball players in the United States
Defecting Cuban baseball players